The 866 is a mercury vapor half-wave rectifier intended for high-voltage applications. The voltage drop is approximately 15 volts up to 150 Hz. To avoid unwanted shorts the tube must be operated in a vertical position and the filament preheated for at least 30 seconds before applying the plate voltage.

Construction
Structurally, it consists of a linear electrode arrangement; a cup shaped anode with top cap and a cylindrical cathode. The socket is a medium 4 pin bayonet UX-4 and the glass envelope is ST-19. The 2.5 volt/ 5 Amp filament is connected to pins 1 and 4.

Operation
Under normal operating conditions the tube glows blue and mercury droplets are visible.

Pictures in working conditions

References

Further reading

External links 
866 @ The National Valve Museum
866A at Radiomuseum.org

Vacuum tubes
Electric power conversion